Saint-Gorgon is a commune in the Morbihan department of Brittany in north-western France. Inhabitants of Saint-Gorgon are called in French Gorgonnais.

See also
Communes of the Morbihan department

References

External links
 Mayors of Morbihan Association 

Saintgorgon